Martin Grothkopp (born 21 June 1986) is a German bobsledder. He competed in the four-man event at the 2018 Winter Olympics, winning the gold medal.

He also represented Germany as a track and field sprinter, competing in the 4 × 400 metres relay team at the 2009 World Championships in Athletics and winning 400 metres gold at the 2009 German Athletics Championships.

References

External links

Martin Grothkopp at the German Bobsleigh, Luge, and Skeleton Federation 

1986 births
Living people
Athletes from Dresden
German male sprinters
German male bobsledders
Olympic bobsledders of Germany
Olympic medalists in bobsleigh
Olympic gold medalists for Germany
Bobsledders at the 2018 Winter Olympics
Medalists at the 2018 Winter Olympics
German national athletics champions